Joaquín Blázquez (born 28 January 2001) is an Argentine professional footballer who plays as a goalkeeper for French  club Brest on loan from Talleres.

Club career
Blázquez was spotted by Talleres scouts in 2013, as he soon joined the Córdoba club. In November 2017, having just signed his first professional contract at the age of sixteen, Blázquez had a week's trial at Premier League outfit Liverpool. Months after trialling in England, Blázquez made three appearances at the 2018 U-20 Copa Libertadores for Talleres. In February 2019, Blázquez completed a loan move to Spain with Valencia B of Segunda División B. He mainly featured for their youth in the División de Honor Juvenil and UEFA Youth League, appearing four times in the latter, but did make the B-team's bench four times.

Despite signing for eighteen months and with a purchase option, Blázquez departed Valencia B at the beginning of 2020 after they declined to sign him. He soon made the substitute's bench for Talleres' matches in the Primera División against Huracán and Patronato in February and March. Blázquez made his senior debut on 19 December in a Copa de la Liga Profesional home draw versus Atlético Tucumán, after replacing an injured Marcos Díaz after just sixteen minutes; back-up goalkeeper Mauricio Caranta had already been ruled out due to injury.

On 27 July 2022, Blázquez joined Brest in France on loan, with an option to buy.

International career
Blázquez represented Argentina at U18, U20 and U23 level. For the U18s, he featured at the 2019 COTIF Tournament in Spain. For the U20s, Blázquez was on the bench for his country's four matches at the 2019 FIFA U-20 World Cup in Poland. For the U23s, he went unused for seven games as Argentina won the 2020 CONMEBOL Pre-Olympic Tournament in Colombia. In November 2018, Blázquez trained against the senior squad ahead of their friendlies with Mexico.

Career statistics

Honours
Argentina U23
CONMEBOL Pre-Olympic Tournament: 2020

Notes

References

2001 births
Living people
Sportspeople from Córdoba Province, Argentina
Argentine footballers
Argentina youth international footballers
Argentina under-20 international footballers
Association football goalkeepers
Argentine expatriate footballers
Expatriate footballers in Spain
Argentine expatriate sportspeople in Spain
Expatriate footballers in France
Argentine expatriate sportspeople in France
Argentine Primera División players
Talleres de Córdoba footballers
Valencia CF Mestalla footballers
Stade Brestois 29 players
Olympic footballers of Argentina
Footballers at the 2020 Summer Olympics